John M. S. Causin (1811 – January 30, 1861) was an American politician.

Causin was born in St. Mary's County, Maryland.  He studied law, was admitted to the bar in Prince George's County, Maryland about 1836, and returned to St. Mary's County to practice.  He served as a  member of the Maryland House of Delegates in 1837 and again 1843, and was elected as a Whig to the Twenty-eighth Congress, serving from March 4, 1843, to March 3, 1845.

After his tenure in Congress, Causin moved to Annapolis, Maryland, and served as a delegate to the State constitutional convention.  He later moved to Chicago, Illinois, in 1858 and resumed the practice of law.  He died in Cairo, Illinois, and is interred in the City Cemetery (now Lincoln Park) of Chicago.

References

1811 births
1861 deaths
Members of the Maryland House of Delegates
People from St. Mary's County, Maryland
Whig Party members of the United States House of Representatives from Maryland
People from Prince George's County, Maryland
Politicians from Annapolis, Maryland
19th-century American politicians